Front Page Story is a 1954 British drama film directed by Gordon Parry and starring Jack Hawkins, Elizabeth Allan and Eva Bartok. It was shot in black-and-white at Shepperton Studios with some location shooting in London. The film's sets were designed by the art director Arthur Lawson.

Plot
Grant is a hard working Fleet Street newspaper editor who refuses to take a long planned holiday with his wife Susan. Instead, to her annoyance, he stays in his office to deal with a number of urgent stories. These include a family of children evicted from their home when their mother dies, a woman charged with euthanasia, and a drunken ex-reporter tracking down an atomic scientist. They all culminate in the story of a plane crash, after which Grant is shocked to find his wife listed as one of the passengers. He discovers Susan was leaving him and going away with one of his colleagues. But did she take the plane?

Cast
 Jack Hawkins as Grant
 Elizabeth Allan as Susan Grant
 Eva Bartok as Mrs. Thorpe
 Derek Farr as Teale
 Michael Goodliffe as Kennedy
 Martin Miller as Dr. Brukmann
 Walter Fitzgerald as Black
 Patricia Marmont as Julie
 Joseph Tomelty as Dan
 Jenny Jones as Jenny
 Stephen Vercoe as Craig
 Helen Haye as Susan's Mother
 Michael Howard as Barrow
 John Stuart as Counsel for the Prosecution
 Bruce Beeby as Counsel for the Defence
 Guy Middleton as Gentle
 Ronald Adam as Editor
 Henry Mollison as Lester

Critical reception
The New York Times critic wrote, "there's nothing wrong with the point of this picture. It just doesn't make it well"; TV Guide found it "a lucid look behind the headlines at the people who get out the news"; while the British Radio Times magazine found it "cosily dated, but an interesting sign of its times."

References

External links
 

1954 films
British drama films
1954 drama films
Films about journalists
Films set in London
Films shot in London
British Lion Films films
Films directed by Gordon Parry
Films shot at Shepperton Studios
1950s English-language films
British black-and-white films
1950s British films